Pinson Lamar "Phil" McCullough (July 22, 1917 – January 16, 2003) was an American professional baseball pitcher. He appeared in one game in Major League Baseball for the Washington Senators during the 1942 season.

References

Major League Baseball pitchers
Washington Senators (1901–1960) players
New Bern Bears players
Kinston Eagles players
Greenville Spinners players
Chattanooga Lookouts players
Oglethorpe Stormy Petrels baseball players
Baseball players from Georgia (U.S. state)
1917 births
2003 deaths